The Ontario Prehospital Advanced Life Support (OPALS) Studies were a series of multi-center before-and-after clinical trials looking at the impact of prehospital advanced life support services. The studies have not found the addition of advanced life support services to increase survival to hospital discharge for cardiac arrest patients.

Cardiac Arrest

 Phase 1, basic life support with defibrillation, January 1, 1991 to January 31, 1995
 Phase 2, optimized basic life support, July 1, 1994, to March 31, 1997
 Phase 3, addition of advanced life support, February 1, 1998, to June 30, 2002

References

Further reading

External links
 OPALS Studies - Emergency Medicine Research - Ottawa Hospital Research Institute
 EMS Article: Is ALS Better than BLS in Trauma Care?
 Measuring the Benefits of ALS in Prehospital Respiratory Care
 Literature Review: Advanced Life Support for Major Trauma Patients

Emergency medical services in Canada
Emergency medicine